Jimmy Graham (born 5 November 1969) is a Scottish former professional footballer who played as a left back.

Career
Born in Glasgow, Graham played for Bradford City, Rochdale, Hull City, Guiseley and Lancaster City.

Personal life
His brothers include fellow players Arthur and Tommy. In 2007, he was working as a social worker in Glasgow.

References

1969 births
Living people
Scottish footballers
Bradford City A.F.C. players
Rochdale A.F.C. players
Hull City A.F.C. players
Guiseley A.F.C. players
Lancaster City F.C. players
English Football League players
Association football fullbacks
Footballers from Glasgow